The Tennessee River Sharks are a defunct professional indoor football team based out of East Ridge, Tennessee, a suburb of Chattanooga. They were a member of the former National Indoor Football League (NIFL). They played their home games at Camp Jordan Arena. Owner Jamie Lamounyon. The general manager head coach was Chris Carter. The team went 5-2 before the team was shut down.

American football in Chattanooga, Tennessee
National Indoor Football League teams
Defunct indoor American football teams
American football teams in Tennessee